Thomas Kofler (born 7 July 1998) is an Austrian professional footballer who plays as a left-back for Regionalliga Tirol club SC Imst.

Career
Kofler is a product of the youth academies of Innsbrucker and AKA Tirol. In 2016, he began his senior career with Wacker Innsbruck II, and in 2019 was promoted to their senior team FC Wacker Innsbruck. He made his professional debut with Wacker Innsbruck II in a 1–0 2. Liga loss to SV Ried on 5 October 2018. On 13 July 2021, he transferred to Hartberg in the Austrian Football Bundesliga, signing a 3-year contract.

On 15 January 2023, Kofler moved to SC Imst in the third-tier Regionalliga Tirol.

References

External links
 
 OEFB Profile

1998 births
Living people
Austrian footballers
FC Wacker Innsbruck (2002) players
TSV Hartberg players
Austrian Football Bundesliga players
2. Liga (Austria) players
Austrian Regionalliga players
Association football fullbacks